The posterior ethmoidal nerve is a nerve of the orbit around the eye. It is a branch of the nasociliary nerve from the ophthalmic nerve (CN V1). It supplies sensation to the sphenoid sinus, the ethmoid sinus, and part of the  dura mater in the anterior cranial fossa.

Structure 
The posterior ethmoidal nerve is a branch of the nasociliary nerve, itself a branch of the ophthalmic nerve (CN V1), itself a branch of the trigeminal nerve (CN V). It passes through the posterior ethmoidal foramen, with the posterior ethmoidal artery. It gives branches to the sphenoid sinus and the ethmoid sinus. It also gives a branch to supply part of the dura mater in the anterior cranial fossa.

Variation 
The posterior ethmoidal nerve is absent in a significant proportion of people. This may be around 30%.

Function 
The posterior ethmoidal nerve supplies sensation to the sphenoid sinus and the ethmoid sinus. It also supplies sensation to part of the dura mater in the anterior cranial fossa.

Other animals 
The posterior ethmoidal nerve is present in other animals, including horses. Headshaking can sometimes be treated with analgesia or neurectomy of the posterior ethmoidal nerve.

Reference

External links 
 
 
 http://www.dartmouth.edu/~humananatomy/figures/chapter_45/45-6.HTM

Ophthalmic nerve